Ty Tabor (born September 17, 1961) is the lead guitarist, songwriter, and co-lead vocalist for the progressive metal band King's X.

Tabor has a wide-ranging guitar style, from big guitar riffs to middling melodic passages. His use of volume swells and ambient passages add an elemental texture to his compositions.  He names his main influences as the Beatles, Allan Holdsworth, Johnny Winter, Ace Frehley, Mel Galley, Brian May, Alex Lifeson, Phil Keaggy, and the original Alice Cooper band. In 2008, Tabor was added to the guitar show "Chop Shop's" list of "Top 100 Most Complete Guitar Players of All Time" at number 84.<ref>{{cite web|url=http://www.roadrunnerrecords.com/blabbermouth.Net/news.aspx?mode=Article&newsitemID=111000|title=JIMMY PAGE, JIMI HENDRIX, EDDIE VAN HALEN, STEVE VAI Among 'Chop Shops Top Guitarists|publisher=BlabberMouth|url-status=dead|archive-url=https://web.archive.org/web/20090315195841/http://www.roadrunnerrecords.com/blabbermouth.net/news.aspx?mode=Article&newsitemID=111000|archive-date=March 15, 2009}}</ref>

History
Ty Tabor was born  in Pearl, Mississippi and began singing and playing guitar at a young age, and by his early teens was performing with his father (an accomplished bluegrass musician) and his brother in a bluegrass band in and around his native Jackson. The band would play various festivals and shows, sharing the bill with bluegrass legends like Lester Flatt and Grandpa Jones. Tabor had also been taken over by the rock and roll sounds of the 1960s and '70s (most notably, The Beatles and Alice Cooper) and began playing in rock bands in his teen years. One of these was a Christian rock outfit called Matthew. Upon graduating from high school, Tabor began touring with Matthew throughout the south. Times were tough on that tour with the band often setting up and performing in the parking lots of restaurants in exchange for food.

He left Matthew and decided to move to Springfield, MO. to attend Evangel College where he quickly entrenched himself in the local music scene. One group he played with got the chance to open up for guitarist Phil Keaggy. However, right before the show, the drummer for Tabor's band quit. Instead of cancelling and missing out on the big opportunity, Tabor volunteered to play drums for the show. Not having his own drum kit however, forced Tabor to ask Keaggy's drummer if he could use his. The drummer, who happened to be Jerry Gaskill, agreed and the show took place.

Tabor and Gaskill again crossed paths during some demo recording sessions with the Tracy Zinn Band. The two became friends and were involved off and on with other musical projects together.

In spring of 1980, Tabor was asked to perform at a talent show at Evangel with a female singer. In the audience was Doug Pinnick, who was impressed by Tabor's performance. Pinnick eventually got in touch with Tabor and the two began collaborating musically.

Eventually Tabor, Pinnick, Gaskill, and guitarist Dan McCollam formed their own band called The Edge which, over time, evolved into King's X. Tabor is the youngest member of King's X, with Pinnick being eleven years his senior, and Gaskill three-and-a-half years older than him.

Since then, Tabor has become one of the more acclaimed and respected guitarists in music today. His playing style and guitar tone, as well as his vocals and songwriting, are crucial elements in the "King's X sound".

Tabor also opened his own recording and mastering facility in Katy, Texas. called Alien Beans Studios. He has mastered numerous album projects as well as produced albums by Rez Band, Jerry Gaskill's solo album, Come Somewhere, and many others. Tabor has since relocated and moved Alien Beans Studios to Kansas City.

Other bands and collaborations

Solo works

After writing and performing almost exclusively for King's X for over 15 years, Tabor's first solo album, Naomi's Solar Pumpkin, was released independently in 1997. Most of the songs from that debut appeared (re-recorded) on his following 1998 album, Moonflower Lane. It was released on Metal Blade Records with much wider distribution as well as a few new tracks, and also featured drummer Alan Doss on the entire album.

Tabor's next release was 2002's Safety, a much more introspective album that reflected on his then-recent divorce. Subsequent Tabor solo albums are Rock Garden (2006), Balance (2008), Something's Coming (2010), Nobody Wins When Nobody Plays (2013) and Shades (2022).

Other bands
Tabor has also been a member of several other bands. He played guitar and sang in Platypus featuring Rod Morgenstein (previously of the Dixie Dregs and Winger) on drums, John Myung (of Dream Theater) on bass, and keyboardist Derek Sherinian (of Planet X and formerly Dream Theater). They released two albums.

The same group minus Derek Sherinian continued on as The Jelly Jam and currently have four full-length albums to their credit.

Ty played guitar solos on 2 tracks, Ode To Pain and Goodbye 25, with Dallas/Houston friends, Mind Body Soul, on their self-titled 4 song EP in 1998, which Ty also mixed and mastered.

Tabor was also involved with the band Jughead featuring two-time David Lee Roth band member Gregg Bissonette (drums), Derek Sherinian (keyboards), and Matt Bissonette (lead vocals, bass). Jughead's self-titled LP was released in 2002 on InsideOut Music.

Tabor has guest appearances on several albums including two different Carmine Appice Guitar Zeus albums, Loudness drummer Munetaka Higuchi's Free World album, and Gregg Bissonette's self-titled solo record.

He also played electric guitar and bass on King's X bandmate Jerry Gaskill's solo album Come Somewhere.

He currently has an ambient / electronica style project with Wally Farkas called Xenuphobe. They have 2 albums that were released through Molken Music.

Tabor also sang one of the human roles on Ayreon's recent release, 01011001.  He played the character "Ty" in the first interlude, Connect the Dots.

Tabor, along with King's X bandmate Doug Pinnick and former Galactic Cowboys members Wally Farkas and Alan Doss, have a new band called The Jibbs who have a single song available for download to benefit relief efforts in the aftermath of Hurricane Ike.

Equipment
Early in his career with King's X, Tabor's guitar sound was considered one of the most sought-after in rock. He played an unusual model of Fender Stratocaster called the "Elite", a short-lived guitar with an on-board active mid-boost circuit that was only in production in the U.S.A. in 1983 and 1984. The remainder of his gear was more of a mystery; he would switch the logos on his amplifiers to keep his tone a secret. He later abandoned this clandestine approach, and revealed in an interview in the May 1996 issue of Guitar Player magazine that he had used a solid-state Gibson Lab Series L5 amplifier along with the Strat Elite guitar to record the first four King's X albums. By the time of the interview, however, he had changed his equipment completely, the main pieces of his gear being a rack-mounted Mesa/Boogie Dual Rectifier and the preamp of his Elite Stratocaster that was converted into a rack-mounted preamp (this allowed him to emulate the sound of his Elite Stratocaster, regardless of what guitar he used), which was his setup during the Dogman era, and would continue into the 1990s and early 2000s.

Tabor endorsed Zion Guitars, around the time of the recording of Dogman''. Phil Keaggy  played Zion Guitars earlier. The Zion Ty Tabor Model was a Strat style guitar, with a basswood body and a maple cap. It featured Joe Barden Pickups, a 3 button pickup selector with no tone control. It came only in candy apple red. The neck was maple with a rosewood fingerboard. It featured a relatively new machine head at the time, a gold accented locking model made by Sperzel. Tabor personally signed each guitar. In recent years, Tabor has endorsed Mesa Boogie, Line 6, and Randall amplifiers, as well as Yamaha guitars, including the AES series and his now discontinued signature RGX-TT model.  The RGX-TT was an unusual guitar in that it featured a basswood body with a maple center section. On this guitar Tabor used pickups by Seymour Duncan, in the H-S-S fashion. The bridge humbucker could be switched to single coil mode with a push switch. On the "Go Tell Somebody" tour with King's X, Tabor is using the M4 preamp from Egnater and Dean Soltero guitars. In 2008 and through mid-2009 Ty toured with two black Frank Lamara designed/Gene Baker built signature model guitars, with pickup (Motor City Pickups) covers showing an X on one and a V on the other. These symbolized the name of the album King's X were supporting at the time. In 2009, Ty began working with luthier John Guilford to create the Ty Tabor model of Guilford guitars. The Ty Tabor model features a mahogany body, maple neck (inlaid with the stylized X at the 12th fret) and maple fretboard, and two Seymour Duncan P-Rails pickups. The combination allows for tones ranging from traditional single-coil to dual humbucker to P90. Ty has used these guitars extensively on tour in support of XV.

Discography

References

External links
 

1961 births
Living people
People from Pearl, Mississippi
People from Katy, Texas
American heavy metal guitarists
Lead guitarists
Progressive metal guitarists
Progressive rock guitarists
King's X members
20th-century American guitarists
The Jelly Jam members
Inside Out Music artists
Metal Blade Records artists